Torren Foot is an Australian house music producer. Together with Dom Dolla he was nominated for the 2017 ARIA Award for Best Dance Release for the song "Be Randy". He reached #1 on the ARIA Club Charts in June 2018 with "Hot Sauce" and in August 2017 with "Be Randy" (with Dom Dolla). He was on the ARIA Club Charts End Of Year Charts in 2015 with "1 2 Step" at #24, in 2016 with "Chosen" at #33 and "TMFW" (with Hey Sam) at #41 and in 2017 with "Love Me" at #4 and "Be Randy" (with Dom Dolla) at #9.

He has performed at Beyond the Valley as well as Falls Festival in 2014 and 2018

Discography

Compilations
 (2015) Onelove 'Digital Love' (Mixed By Torren Foot)

Singles

Awards and nominations

ARIA Music Awards
The ARIA Music Awards are annual awards, which recognises excellence, innovation, and achievement across all genres of Australian music. They commenced in 1987.

! 
|-
| 2017 || "Be Randy"  || Best Dance Release ||  || 
|-

References

Australian musicians
Australian DJs
Australian house musicians
Electronic dance music DJs
Living people
Year of birth missing (living people)